The , known as the  for sponsorship reasons, is the top level of the  system. Founded in 1992, it is one of the most successful leagues in Asian club football. Contested by 18 clubs, it operates on a system of promotion and relegation with the J2 League. Until the 2014 season, it was known as the J League Division 1.

History

Phases of J1

Before the professional league (1992 and earlier)
Before the inception of the J.League, the highest level of club football was the Japan Soccer League (JSL), which consisted of amateur clubs. Despite being well-attended during the boom of the late 1960s and early 1970s (when Japan's national team won the bronze Olympic medal at the 1968 games in Mexico), the JSL went into decline in the 1980s, in general line with the deteriorating situation worldwide. Fans were few, the grounds were not of the highest quality, and the Japanese national team was not on a par with the Asian powerhouses. To raise the level of play domestically, to attempt to garner more fans, and to strengthen the national team, the Japan Football Association (JFA) decided to form a professional league.

The professional association football league, J.League was formed in 1992, with eight clubs drawn from the JSL First Division, one from the Second Division, and the newly formed Shimizu S-Pulse. At the same time, JSL changed its name and became the former Japan Football League, a semi-professional league. Although the J.League did not officially launch until 1993, the Yamazaki Nabisco Cup competition was held between the ten clubs in 1992 to prepare for the inaugural season.

Inaugural season and J.League boom (1993–1995)
J.League officially kicked off its first season with ten clubs in early 1993.

After the boom (1996–1999)
Despite the success in the first three years, in early 1996 the league attendance declined rapidly. In 1997 the average attendance was 10,131, compared to more than 19,000 in 1994. Notably, Arsène Wenger managed Nagoya Grampus Eight during this period.

Change of infrastructure and game formats (1999–2004)

The league's management finally realized that they were heading in the wrong direction. In order to solve the problem, the management came out with two solutions.

First, they announced the J.League Hundred Year Vision, in which they aim to make 100 professional association football clubs in the nation of Japan by 2092, the hundredth season. The league also encouraged the clubs to promote football or non-football related sports and health activities, to acquire local sponsorships, and to build good relationship with their hometowns at the grass-root level. The league believed that this will allow the clubs to bond with their respective cities and towns and get support from local government, companies, and citizens. In other words, clubs will be able to rely on the locals, rather than major national sponsors.

Second, the infrastructure of the league was heavily changed in 1999. The league acquired nine clubs from the semi-professional JFL and one club from J.League to create a two division system. The top flight became the J.League Division 1 (J1) with 16 clubs while J.League Division 2 (J2) was launched with ten clubs in 1999. The former second-tier Japan Football League now became the third-tier Japan Football League.

Also, until 2004 (with the exception of 1996 season), the J1 season was divided into two. At the end of each full season, the champions from each half played a two-legged series to determine the overall season winners and runners-up. Júbilo Iwata in 2002, and Yokohama F. Marinos in 2003, won both "halves" of the respective seasons, thus eliminating the need for the playoff series. This was the part of the reason the league abolished the split-season system starting from 2005.

European League Format & AFC Champions League (2005–2008)
Since the 2005 season, J.League Division 1 consisted of 18 clubs (from 16 in 2004) and the season format became more similar to European club football. The number of relegated clubs also increased from 2 to 2.5, with the 3rd-to-last club going into a promotion/relegation playoff with the third-placed J2 club. Since then, other than minor adjustments, the top flight has stayed consistent.

Japanese teams did not treat the AFC Champions League seriously in the early years, in part due to the distances travelled and teams involved. However, in the 2008 Champions League, three Japanese sides made the quarter-finals.

However, in recent years, with the inclusion of the A-League in Eastern Asia, introduction to the Club World Cup, and increased marketability in the Asian continent, both the league and the clubs paid more attention to Asian competition. For example, Kawasaki Frontale built up a notable fan base in Hong Kong, owing to their participation in the Asian Champions League during the 2007 season. Continuous effort led to the success of Urawa Red Diamonds in 2007 and Gamba Osaka in 2008. Thanks to excellent league management and competitiveness in Asian competition, the AFC awarded J.League the highest league ranking and a total of four slots starting from the 2009 season. The league took this as an opportunity to sell TV broadcasting rights to foreign countries, especially in Asia.

Also starting from the 2008 season, the Emperor's Cup Winner was allowed to participate in the upcoming Champions League season, rather than waiting a whole year (i.e. 2005 Emperor's Cup winner, Tokyo Verdy, participated in the 2007 ACL season, instead of the 2006 season). In order to fix this one-year lag issue, the 2007 Emperor's Cup winner, Kashima Antlers' turn was waived. Nonetheless, Kashima Antlers ended up participating in the 2009 ACL season by winning the J.League title in the 2008 season.

Modern phase (2009–2016)
Three major changes were seen starting in the 2009 season. First, starting that season, four clubs entered the AFC Champions League. Secondly, the number of relegation slots increased to three. Finally, the AFC Player slot was implemented starting this season. Each club will be allowed to have a total of four foreign players; however, one slot is reserved for a player that derives from an AFC country other than Japan. Also, as a requirement of being a member of the Asian Football Confederation, in 2012 the J.League Club Licence became one criterion of whether a club was permitted to be promoted to a higher tier in professional level leagues. No major changes happened to J.League Division 1 as the number of clubs stayed at 18.

In 2015 the J.League Division 1 was renamed J1 League. Also, the tournament format was changed to a three-stage system. The season was split into first and second stages, followed by a third and final championship stage. The third stage was composed of three to five teams.  The top point accumulator in each stage and the top three point accumulators for the overall season qualified.  If both of the stage winners finished in the top three teams for the season, then only three teams qualified for the championship stage.  These teams then took part in a championship playoff stage to decide the winner of the league trophy.

Current (2017–)
Despite the new multi-stage format being initially reported as locked in for five seasons, due to negative reaction from hardcore fans and failure to appeal to casual fans, after 2016 it was abandoned in favour of a return to a single-stage system. From 2017, the team which accumulates the most points will be named champion, with no championship stage taking place at the season's end, and from 2018, the bottom two clubs are relegated and the 16th-placed club enters a playoff with the J2 club that wins a promotion playoff series. If the J2 playoff winner prevails, the club is promoted, with the J1 club being relegated, otherwise the J1 club can retain its position in J1 League with the promotion failure of the J2 club.

In November 2017, Urawa Red Diamonds played the AFC Champions League final against Al Hilal. After a draw in the first leg, Urawa Red Diamonds won the second leg 1-0 and were crowned Asian Champions. In the past 10–15 years, Japanese clubs have risen not only continentally, but also internationally. Clubs Gamba Osaka and Urawa Red Diamonds have been crowned Asian champions and participated in the Club World Cup, always targeting at least the semi-finals. Kashima Antlers were finalists of the 2016 edition and eventually lost to Real Madrid.

Timeline

Crest

2023 season

League format 

Eighteen clubs play in double round-robin (home and away) format, a total of 34 games each. A club receives 3 points for a win, 1 point for a tie, and 0 points for a loss. The clubs are ranked by points, and tiebreakers are, in the following order: 
 Goal differential
 Goals scored
 Head-to-head results
 Disciplinary points
A draw would be conducted, if necessary. However, if two clubs are tied for first place, both clubs will be declared as co-champions. The top three clubs will qualify to the following year's AFC Champions League, while the bottom two clubs will be relegated to J2. The third-bottom club will play a playoff against the J2 playoffs winning team.

Prize money (2020 figures)
 Champions: 300,000,000 yen
 Second place: 120,000,000 yen
 Third place: 60,000,000 yen

In addition to the prize, the top 4 clubs are awarded with the following funds.

J league funds distributed to top 4 clubs (from 2017)
 Champions: 1,550,000,000 yen
 Second place: 700,000,000 yen
 Third place: 350,000,000 yen
 Fourth place: 180,000,000 yen

Participating clubs 

Source for teams participating:
Pink background denotes club was most recently promoted from J2 League.
"Year joined" is the year the club joined the J.League (Division 1 unless otherwise indicated).
"First season in top flight", "Seasons in top flight", "Current spell in top flight", and "Last title" include seasons in the old Japan Soccer League First Division.

Stadiums (2023) 

Primary venues used in the J1 League:

Former clubs

Grey background denotes club was most recently relegated to J2 League.
"Year joined" is the year the club joined the J.League (Division 1 unless otherwise indicated).
"First season in top flight", "Seasons in top flight", "Last spell in top flight", and "Last title" includes seasons in the old Japan Soccer League First Division.

Statistics

All-time J1 League table
The all-time J1 League table is a cumulative record of all match results, points, and goals of every team that has played in the J1 League. The table that follows is accurate as of the end of the 2022 season. Teams in bold are part of the 2023 J1 League.

Note: For statistical purposes, the traditional 3–1–0 points system is used for all matches. As in the season, 1993–1994 did not use the point system. In seasons 1995–1996 were using 3 pts for any win, 1 pt for PK loss, and 0 pts for regulation or extra time loss. In seasons 1997-1998 were using 3 pts for a regulation win, 2 pts for extra-time win, 1 pt for PK win, and 0 pts for any loss. And from seasons 1999–2002 were using 3 pts for a regulation win, 2 pts for an extra time win, and 1 pt for a tie. 

League or status at 2022:

Championship history

Most successful clubs
Clubs in bold compete in top flight for the 2023 season.

Relegation history 
Only four clubs have never been relegated from J1. Among those, only two clubs – Kashima Antlers and Yokohama F. Marinos – have been participating in every league season since its establishment in 1993. Sagan Tosu were promoted to the first division in 2012, and remain there ever since. The former J.League club Yokohama Flügels never experienced relegation before their merger with Yokohama Marinos in 1999.

JEF United Chiba holds the record for the longest top flight participation streak of 44 consecutive seasons in the first divisions of JSL and J.League that lasted since the establishment of JFL in 1965 and ended with their relegation in 2009. The longest ongoing top flight streak belongs to Yokohama F. Marinos who play in the top flight since 1982 (42 seasons as of 2022).

The 1998 season
When the league introduced the two-division system in 1999, they also reduced number of Division 1 club from 18 to 16. At the end of 1998 season, they hosted the J.League Promotion Tournament to determine two relegating clubs.

Split-season era (1999–2004, 2015–2016)
Throughout 1999 to 2003 seasons, two bottom clubs were relegated to Division 2. To accommodate for split-season format, combined overall standings were used to determine the relegating clubs. This created a confusing situation, where for the championship race stage standing were used, while overall standing was used for relegation survival.

At end of the 2004 season, Division 1 again expanded from 16 to 18 clubs. No clubs were relegated; however, last-placed (16th) club had to play Promotion/relegation Series against 3rd placed club from J2. Again, to determine 16th placed club, overall standing was used instead of stage standing.

For two seasons starting in 2015, three bottom clubs were relegated based on overall standings.

Single season era (2005–2014, 2017–2019, 2022–present)
For the next four seasons, 2005 to 2008, the number of relegating clubs was increased to 2.5, with two clubs from each division being promoted and relegated directly, and two more (15th in J1 and 3rd in J2) competed in Promotion/relegation Series.

In 2009, the pro/rele series were abandoned and three teams are directly exchanged between divisions. In 2012, promotion playoffs were introduced in J2, allowing teams that finished from 3rd to 6th to compete for J1 promotion place. For the 2018, 2019 and 2022 seasons, the bottom two teams are relegated and the entry playoff has the 16th team play the J2 playoff winner.

Single season era (2021)
No teams descended to J2 after the 2020 season due to the COVID-19 pandemic in Japan and its effects. Instead, four relegations were in place for the 2021 season to bring back the number of teams from 20 to 18.

Summary

* Bold designates relegated clubs;† Won the Pro/Rele Series or entry playoff;‡ Lost the Pro/Rele Series or entry playoff and relegated

Other tournaments
Domestic tournaments
Fujifilm Super Cup (1994–present)
Emperor's Cup (1921–present)
J.League YBC Levain Cup (1992–present, excluding 1995)
J1/J2 play-offs (2018–2022, excluding 2020/21)

International tournaments
FIFA Club World Cup (2007–2008, 2011–2012, 2015–2016)
AFC Champions League (1969, 1986/87–2002/03, 2004–present)
J-League Cup/Copa Sudamericana Championship (2008–present)

Defunct tournament
Suntory Championship (1993–2004, excluding 1996)
Sanwa Bank Cup (1994–1997)
JOMO All-Stars Soccer (1993–2007)
A3 Champions Cup (2003–2007)
Promotion/relegation Series (2004–2008)
Pan-Pacific Championship (2008, 2009)

Players and managers

Players
List of J1 League players
List of foreign J1 League players

Managers
List of J.League managers

Media coverage

Japan 
All J1 matches are streamed live through DAZN until 2028 season, with selected matches also televised live plus highlights of other matches also available on public broadcaster NHK.

Outside Japan 
The league is currently covered internationally (excluding China) by NHK World Premium (Japanese audio only) and Dentsu. Four matches per week available on J.League official Youtube channel (for countries without broadcasting rights agreement only) and several broadcasters around the world.

 – as main distributor, including J2 matches

See also

 Sport in Japan
 Football in Japan
 Women's football in Japan
 Japan Football Association (JFA)

 Association football
 League system
 Japanese association football league system
 J.League records and statistics 
 J.League
 J1 League (Tier 1)
 J2 League (Tier 2)
 J3 League (Tier 3)
 Japan Football League (JFL) (Tier 4)
 Regional Champions League (Promotion playoffs to JFL)
 Regional Leagues (Tier 5/6)

 Domestic cup
 Fujifilm Super Cup (Super Cup)
 Emperor's Cup (National Cup)
 J.League YBC Levain Cup (League Cup)

 Futsal
 F.League
 F1 League (Tier 1)
 F2 League (Tier 2)
 JFA Futsal Championship (National Cup)
 F.League Ocean Cup (League Cup)

 Beach soccer
 Beach Soccer Championship (National Cup)

References

External links
 Official website, JLeague.jp 
 Official YouTube Channel 
 RSSSF.com - Japan - List of Champions

 
1
1
Top level football leagues in Asia
Summer association football leagues
Sports leagues established in 1992
1992 establishments in Japan
Professional sports leagues in Japan